Electronic Church Muzik is the fourth studio album by Ant-Bee, released on February 28, 2011 by Barking Moondog Records. Recorded over the course of several years, it features musical contributions from members of The Alice Cooper Group, Flash, Focus, Gong, The Magic Band, The Mothers of Invention and Utopia.

Track listing

Personnel 
Adapted from Electronic Church Muzik liner notes.

Billy James (as The Ant-Bee) – vocals (2, 8, 15), tape (3, 4, 10, 11, 13-15, 17, 20), percussion (1-6, 8, 9, 13, 15, 20, 21), Mellotron (8, 11, 14, 20), vibraphone (4, 13, 14, 20), guitar (1, 21), keyboards (2, 14), harp (6, 14), cuíca (4), washboard (6), violin (8), choir (12), production
Musician
Jan Akkerman – guitar (11)
Daevid Allen – vocals (3, 21)
Artemiy Artemiev – keyboards (12)
Peter Banks – guitar (5, 9)
Jimmy Carl Black – spoken word (4)
Mark Boston (as Rockette Morton) – bass guitar (6)
Michael Bruce – guitar (2, 8), bass guitar (2, 8), sitar (2), vocals (7), keyboards (8)
Napoleon Murphy Brock – vocals (20)
Bruce Cameron – guitar (15), bass guitar (15), sitar (15)
Jack Dougherty – pedal steel guitar (20)
Peter Frohmader – keyboards (13), electronics (13)

Musician (cont.)
Bunk Gardner – saxophone (2, 3, 4, 20), flute (1)
Buzz Gardner – trumpet (3)
Cor Gout – vocals (10)
Moogy Klingman – keyboards (20)
Bill Harkleroad (Zoot Horn Rollo) – guitar (6)
Mike Logiovino – bass guitar (9)
Rod Martin – trumpet (2, 3)
Groucho Marx – vocals (16)
Zad McGough – background vocals (20)
Alessandro Pizzin – keyboards (10)
Don Preston – Moog synthesizer (3, 20), keyboards (3, 4), electronics (3)
George Scala – recorder (8)
Jim Sherwood (as Motorhead) – snorks (4)
Gilli Smyth – vocals (1, 5, 21), spoken word (17)

Release history

References

External links 
 Electronic Church Muzik at Discogs (list of releases)

Ant-Bee albums
2011 albums